Hymns from Nineveh is a pop folk musical project of Danish singer and guitarist Jonas Petersen established in 2007 and signed to Warner Music Denmark.

Jonas Petersen started with the 4-member indiepop band Attrap in 2006 and appeared in DR P3 program Elektriske Barometer. Although Attrap's release House of Dreams and the track "1234" found critical acclaim, and the project folded in 2007. After Attrap, Petersen started his solo music project Hymns from Nineveh, with live performances by Petersen (vocals and guitar), Nikolaj Paakjær (piano, organ and synthesizer), Jakob Brixen (electric guitar, banjo and shahi baaja, a type of Indian sitar), Jacob Haubjerg (bass) and Carl Andreas Brixen (drums). It took part in a number of festivals and live events.

The initial recording was the EP Uncomplicated Christmassongs , on 30 November 2009 followed on 21 February 2011 by the official debut self-titled album Hymns from Nineveh. The Danish music site Gaffa considered the album as the best Danish album of 2011. The band also released on 22 November of the same year a follow up Endurance in Christmas Time.

In September 2013, the band released Vision supported by Parlophone Music.

Discography

Albums

EPs

References

External links
Official website
Facebook

Danish musical groups